Rally San Marino is a motorsport event for rally cars, held in San Marino with some stages located in the neighbouring Italian province Emilia-Romagna. The first rally was held in 1970 and currently is part of the Italian Rally Championship. The rally was also regular part of the European Rally Championship until the coefficient demise in 2004. In 2012 the rally was included in the Intercontinental Rally Challenge.

The only Sammarinese driver to win the rally until 2018 is Massimo Ercolani - he has won it 3 times.

Previous winners

References

External links
 The official website for the rally

Rally competitions in San Marino
Intercontinental Rally Challenge rallies